Promi Big Brother 2020, also known as Promi Big Brother 8, was the eighth season of the German reality television series Promi Big Brother. The show began airing on 7 August 2020 on Sat.1 and ended after 24 days on 28 August 2020, making it the longest celebrity season to date. It is the eighth celebrity season and the ninth season of Big Brother in total to air on Sat.1 to date. Jochen Schropp and Marlene Lufen both returned as hosts of the show.

The live late-night show with the name Die Late Night Show returned on sixx and was aired again every day after the main show on Sat.1. Jochen Bendel and Melissa Khalaj returned as hosts of the late-night show. Special guests joined the presenter duo to analyzing the situation of the show and it also features exclusive live broadcasts from the house.

The Watch Together Show from the previous season was replaced by the Warm up Show mit Aaron. The web show Warm up Show with Aaron was broadcast daily 20 minutes before the show on Facebook as well as on the website promibigbrother.de. In the show, Aaron Troschke speaks with a studio guest about the housemates and the TV episodes. In addition, audience comments on Facebook were integrated into the show. The show then was made available there on demand.

The short-minute web show entitled Raffas Recap was published on IGTV every day from 8 August 2020 at 7 a.m. There the YouTuber Raffaela "Raffa" Zollo commented on the events from the last TV episode.

Claudia Obert hosted a new web show with the name Oberts Märchenstunde for the first time on Joyn and promibigbrother.de. The show was broadcast every Sunday and Wednesday.

The web show Das jüngste Gerücht (The youngest rumor) was published on Facebook and IGTV on 22 July 2020. In the five- to seven-minute episodes commented and discussed the YouTubers Aaron Troschke and Raffaela "Raffa" Zollo, as well as changing guests as the winner of season 1 Jenny Elvers, TV personality Claudia Obert or YouTuber Mr. Trash TV all Speculation as to who might be on the show. Until 4 August 2020, a new episode and a total of five episodes were published on Wednesdays, Sundays and once on Tuesday.

Werner Hansch was announced as the winner of the season, with Mischa Mayer as the runner-up. As Jochen Schropp announced in the final, Werner Hansch, aged 82, is the world's oldest winner of Big Brother.

Production
For the first time, the show will air live for 3 weeks.

Eye Logo
Like in the previous season the eye logo is the same.

Teasers
In July 2020, a one-minute teaser was released promoting the season.

Opening Intro
The song of this year intro and outro is "Mehr Davon" from Lotte. Like the previous season, the intro for the matches is "The Hanging Tree" from James Newton Howard feat. Jennifer Lawrence.

House
The official pictures of the new Promi Big Brother house were released on 6 August 2020. In this season, the house features again two areas: the Fairy Tale Castle as the Luxurious Area and the Fairy Tale Forest as the Poor Area.

Format
Once again, the residents in the poor area can go shopping in a small Penny market as part of a product placement. This time, however, the viewers decide via Sat.1-App.

For the first time there will be a wish tree in which the poor people can use luxury talers to wish for luxury items from Big Brother. The tree and thaler replace the big donor and big coins that were introduced in season five.

Housemates
On 3 August 2020, were announced the first 12 celebrities housemates to be participating in this season. They entered the house on 5 August. The last four housemates, who will enter on 7 August, were announced the same day that entered the house. On 14 August and on 17 August, two new housemates entered the house.

On 4 August 2020, Saskia Beecks who would enter the house on the first day, it was announced that she will not be taking part in the eighth season of Promi Big Brother, for personal reasons. She was replaced by Jenny Frankhauser.

Aaron Königs
Aaron Königs is a television personality. He began his career on the German version of Prince Charming on 2019. He participated on 2020 on the show The Mole – Wem kannst du trauen?. He entered the House on Day 13. He became the seventh housemate to be evicted on Day 20.

Adela Smajić
Adela Smajić is a reality television personality. She began her career in 2018, where she was the Bachelorette in the Swiss version. She is a Presenter in the regional Swiss television broadcaster on Telebasel. She entered the House on Day 1. She became the fifth housemate to be evicted on Day 18.

Alessia-Millane Herren
Alessia-Millane Herren is the daughter of Willi Herren. She has participated in the show Ab ins Kloster! – Rosenkranz statt Randale. She is the youngest housemate in the history of Promi Big Brother. She entered the House on Day 10. She became the third housemate to be evicted on Day 13.

Claudia Kohde-Kilsch
Claudia Kohde-Kilsch was a big tennis player. Since 2019 she is a member of the Social Democratic Party of Germany. She entered the House on Day 1. She became the first housemate to be evicted on Day 6.

Elene Lucia Ameur
Elene Lucia Ameur is an actress and model. From 2018 until 2019 she has played in the series Berlin – Tag & Nacht. She entered the House on Day 1. On Day 14, she voluntarily left the house.

Emmy Russ
Emmy Russ is a reality television personality. She began her career in 2020, when she participated in the german reality show Beauty & The Nerd. She has participated also in the show Ab ins Kloster! – Rosenkranz statt Randale. She entered the House on Day 1. She became the eleventh housemate to be evicted on Day 23.

Ikke Hüftgold
Ikke Hüftgold is a singer and his real name is Matthias Distel. He entered the House on Day 1. He left the house on Day 24 in fourth place.

Jasmin Tawil
Jasmin Tawil is a German singer and actress. She has played in the series Gute Zeiten, schlechte Zeiten from 2005 until 2008. She was together with singer and songwriter Adel Tawil for 13 years and in 2011 they married until the separation in 2014. She entered the House on Day 1. She became the second housemate to be evicted on Day 10.

Jenny Frankhauser
Jenny Frankhauser is a TV personality. She became better known to the public as the sister of Daniela Katzenberger and as the winner of the 12th season of Ich bin ein Star – Holt mich hier raus!. She was the replacement for Saskia Beecks who quit the show prior to entering the house. She entered the House on Day 1. On Day 8, Jenny voluntarily left the house.

Kathy Kelly
Kathy Kelly is a musician. She is also a member of the musical family group The Kelly Family. She entered the House on Day 1. She left the house on Day 24 in third place.

Katy Bähm
Katy Bähm is a drag queen. Her real name is Burak Bildik. She participated at the first season of Queen of Drags. She entered the House on Day 3. She became the tenth housemate to be evicted on Day 23.

Mischa Mayer
Mischa Mayer is a reality television personality. He began his career on the third season of the German Love Island. He entered the House on Day 1. He left the house on Day 24 as the Runner-Up.

Ramin Abtin
Ramin Abtin is a Kickboxing world champion. He began his career as a coach on The Biggest Loser Germany. He entered the House on Day 3. He became the eighth housemate to be evicted on Day 21.

Sascha Heyna
Sascha Heyna is a shopping channel host and singer. He entered the House on Day 1. He became the sixth housemate to be evicted on Day 19.

Senay Güler
Senay Güler is a DJ, model and actor. He began his career as an actor in the television series 4 Blocks. He entered the House on Day 1. On Day 8, Senay voluntarily left the house.

Simone Mecky-Ballack
Simone Mecky-Ballack is a TV personality. She is the ex-wife of soccer player Michael Ballack. She participated in the sixth season of Let's Dance. She entered the House on Day 3. She became the ninth housemate to be evicted on Day 22.

Udo Bönstrup
Udo Bönstrup is a comedian and a German Youtuber. He entered the House on Day 1. He became the fourth housemate to be evicted on Day 17.

Werner Hansch
Werner Hansch is a Sports commentator. He is the oldest housemate in the history of Promi Big Brother. He entered the House on Day 3. He was announced as the winner of the season on Day 24.

Castle and Forest

Reason

 : Ikke, Jenny, Kathy, Sascha, Simone and Werner moved from the Forest to the Castle and was decided by the viewers votes.
 : Claudia moved from the Forest to the Castle and was decided by the housemates in the Castle. Jenny moved from the Castle to the Forest and was decided by the viewers votes.
 : Udo moved from the Forest to the Castle and was decided by the housemates in the Castle. Ikke moved from the Castle to the Forest and was decided by the viewers votes.
 : Emmy, Ikke, Katy and Senay moved from the Forest to the Castle and was decided by the viewers votes. Claudia, Sascha, Simone, Udo and Werner moved from the Castle to the Forest and was decided by the viewers votes.
 : Mischa moved from the Forest to the Castle and was decided by the housemates in the Castle. Senay moved from the Castle to the Forest and was decided by the viewers votes.
 : Werner moved from the Forest to the Castle and was decided by the housemates in the Castle. Emmy and Mischa moved from the Castle to the Forest and was decided by the viewers votes.
 : At first the housemates in the Castle decide that Adela, Elene and Jasmin to move from the Forest to the Castle. Then the viewers decide that Adela to return in the Forest.
 : On Day 12, at first Emmy from the Forest played a match and if she would won it, she and her other housemates from the Forest would move to the Castle and the housemates from the Castle would move to the Forest. Emmy won the match and then all the housemates went to the Castle. At the end of the show the viewers decide which of the eight housemates that were in the Castle would return again to the Forest. They chose Alessia and Emmy.
 : On Day 13, at first the housemates in the Forest decided that Simone to move with them, then the viewers votes decided that she must move again in the Castle.
 : At first the housemates in the Castle lost the match and all move to the Forest. Then the viewers decided that Ikke and Werner to move to the Castle.
 : The housemates in the Castle decided that Sascha to move with them. Sascha had the choice to take with him one housemate to the Castle. He choose Emmy. Then the viewers decided to move Emmy back again to the Forest.
 : The housemates in the Forest decided themselves that Emmy, Kathy and Katy to move with them. Then the viewers decided to move Katy and Sascha back again to the Forest.
 : The housemates had to play a match and the winner of each pair moved to the Castle and the loser to the Forest. Aaron, Emmy, Kathy, Ramin, Sascha and Udo won and moved to the Castle. Adela, Katy, Ikke, Mischa, Simone and Werner moved to the  Forest.
 : Since the housemates broke several rules the Castle was closed and everyone lived in the Forest.

Arena

Match Arena
The housemates from the poor "Fairy Tale Forest" area compete in the "Outdoor Match Arena" in order to earn additional money for shopping at the supermarket.

 Big Brother decide who would face the match
 The housemates decided who would face the match

Duel Arena
In addition to the Match, there are also Duels against each other.

Nominations table

Notes

 : For the first time in history of Promi Big Brother, the viewers were given the power to determine which housemates are nominated for the eviction. Claudia and Udo had the fewest votes and were nominated. The remaining housemates decide which one of them will be evicted.
 : Before the voting Claudia and Udo, as the nominees, played a game in the Duel Arena and the winner would pick a housemate that his/her vote would not count. Udo, as the winner, picked Elene and her vote didn't counted.
 : As a punishment for breaking Big Brother's rules, Elene and Jenny were automatically put up for eviction by Big Brother. Jenny voluntarily left the house on Day 8 prior to the eviction. Elene saved herself from eviction by winning a challenge. Werner received the most votes in a vote count and was therefore saved from eviction.
 : Ramin won the Bottle Shake duel against Ikke, therefore all Castle housemates were immune from eviction.
 : Emmy and Sascha won the duel, therefore all Castle housemates were immune from eviction and they didn't nominate.
 : Aaron and Ikke faced off in the duel, in which Aaron won immunity. By losing, Ikke was automatically up for eviction. Only male housemates were allowed to be nominated in face-to-face nominations.
 : After Sascha's eviction, housemates were told to rank themselves who deserved winning the most. The housemates ranked last automatically gets nominated. Aaron was ranked last, so he is nominated for eviction.
 : As the result of that night's Duel, Simone received a killer nomination and Katy received immunity. Both could opt to give it to another housemate not already nominated. Simone and Katy chose to keep it for themselves. 
 : As the result of that night's Duel Werner could save one teammate and he chose Katy while Kathy had to decide which teammate would be nominated immediately. She chose Ramin.
 : As the result of that night's Duel the votes of the men counted twice.
 : One day before the final two housemates had to leave the house. After the match Katy, Mischa and Werner won a second vote for the first nomination of the night.

Ratings

References

External links
Official Homepage

2020 German television seasons
08